Sukh Chayn Gardens (Punjabi) is a  located within union council 122 (Maraka) in Iqbal Tehsil of Lahore, Punjab, Pakistan. In December 2004, a contract was signed between Pakistan and China and the foundation stone was laid. Sukh Chayn Gardens has a total area of 2132.45 kanals (1 kanal = 1/8 acre), out of which 1261.97 kanals are residential, 52.65 kanals commercial, 46.33 kanals for public use and 157.13 kanals for open spaces.

Subdivisions
Sukh Chayn Garden has residential sectors called A through H, with each sector consisting of a central park and a commercial area.

References

External links
 Official site of Sukh Chayn Gardens
 Sukh Chayn Coffee Table Book

Iqbal Town, Lahore
Housing estates in Pakistan
Lahore District